Yaroslav Volodymyrovych Markevych (born 3 December 1973) is a Ukrainian politician, businessman, activist, former soldier in the Donbas Battalion, former Member of Parliament of Ukraine of the 8th convocation from Samopmich Union, and Member of the Parliamentary Budget Committee. Markevych did not return to parliament following the 2019 Ukrainian parliamentary election.

Biography 
Yaroslav Markevych was born in Kamin-Rybolov, a village in Khankaysky District in Primorsky Krai, Russia. He studied at the Institute of the Social Development, on the faculty of Legal Support of the Financial Activities of the Enterprise. In 1992 he started working as a lawyer in a private trade house. From 1993 to 1995 he worked as a Deputy Director of the private scientific-producing firm PRINT. In 1996 he was a press-secretary at AT STANK. BeforeUntil his election to Ukrainian parliament he worked as manager and deputy head at a number of private companies.

In 2005 he started working with Viktor Yushchenko's party Nasha Ukraina, taking the post of the Head of the Executive Committee of the Kharkiv city party organisation, from 2008 – the Oblast party organisation. Since 2000 he was the president of the civic organisation East Ukrainian Fund of Democracy Development.

In 2004 he was the consultant on pre-elections issues to OSCE.

Markevych is married and has two children.

References 

1973 births
Living people
People from Khankaysky District
Politicians from Kharkiv
Recipients of the Cross of Ivan Mazepa
Eighth convocation members of the Verkhovna Rada
Our Ukraine (political party) politicians
Self Reliance (political party) politicians
Ukrainian military personnel of the war in Donbas